KKBJ may refer to:

KKBJ (AM), a radio station (1360 AM) licensed to Bemidji, Minnesota, United States
KKBJ-FM, a radio station (103.7 FM) licensed to Bemidji, Minnesota, United States